Jonathan Niles Havelock  was a Cabinet Minister from Alberta, Canada.

Jon Havelock was elected as the Progressive Conservative Association of Alberta member for Calgary Shaw in the 1993 Alberta general election after the former member of the riding Jim Dinning, switched ridings to Calgary Lougheed.

He was re-elected in 1997 and held the Justice Minister and Attorney General cabinet portfolios until 1999, when he moved to the Economic Development and Tourism portfolios. He retired from politics in 2001.

In addition to being a provincial MLA, Havelock has served on Calgary Municipal council as a school board trustee and an Alderman.

He currently serves as President of Strategic Relations Inc.

External links
AlumNAIT fall 2001 edition
City of Calgary Alderman biography Page 192

Calgary city councillors
Living people
Progressive Conservative Association of Alberta MLAs
Members of the Executive Council of Alberta
Year of birth missing (living people)